The 1979–80 season was the 65th season of the Isthmian League, an English football competition.

At the end of the previous season Alliance Premier League was created. As a result of it, Isthmian League clubs lost possibility to take part in the elections to the Football League as only highest placed club from Alliance Premier League who met the Football League requirements may apply. Isthmian League refused to participate in the formation of the new league. There was no promotion from the Isthmian League to the Alliance Premier League till 1985.

Premier Division

The Premier Division consisted of 22 clubs, including 20 clubs from the previous season and two new clubs, promoted from Division One:
Harlow Town
Harrow Borough

League table

Division One

Division One consisted of 22 clubs, including 18 clubs from the previous season and three new clubs:

One club relegated from the Premier Division:
Kingstonian

Leytonstone also relegated from the Premier Division at the end of the previous season, merged with Ilford to create the new club Leytonstone & Ilford, thus, St Albans City were reprieved.

Two clubs promoted from Division Two:
Camberley Town
Farnborough Town

League table

Division Two

Second Division consisted of 19 clubs, including 16 clubs from the previous season and three new teams:
Barton Rovers, joined from the South Midlands League
Billericay Town, joined from the Athenian League
Southall & Ealing Borough, relegated from Division One

Prior to the season Southall & Ealing Borough changed name to Southall.

League table

References

Isthmian League seasons
I